Rubus gnarus is a North American species of flowering plant in the rose family. It is native to the northeastern United States (New York, Connecticut, New Jersey).

The genetics of Rubus is extremely complex, so that it is difficult to decide on which groups should be recognized as species. There are many rare species with limited ranges such as this. Further study is suggested to clarify the taxonomy.

References

gnarus
Plants described in 1944
Flora of the Northeastern United States
Flora without expected TNC conservation status